Buen is a surname. Notable people with the surname include:

Anders Buen (1864–1933), Norwegian typographer, newspaper editor, trade unionist, and politician
Hauk Buen (1933–2021), Norwegian hardingfele fiddler and fiddle maker
Knut Buen (born 1948), Norwegian fiddler, composer, folklorist, and publisher

See also
Buin-e Olya